Bentleigh may refer to:

 Bentleigh, Victoria, Australia; a suburb of Melbourne
 Bentleigh railway station
 Electoral district of Bentleigh, Victoria, Australia
 Bentleigh Football Netball Club, of the SFNL, in Melbourne, Victoria, Australia
 Bentleigh Secondary College, Bentleigh East, Victoria, Australia

See also

 Bentleigh East, Victoria, Australia; a suburb of Melbourne
 Bentleigh West Primary School, Glen Eira, Victoria, Australia
 
 Bentley (disambiguation)
 Bently (disambiguation)
 Bent (disambiguation)
 Leigh (disambiguation)